This is a list of episodes of the 2014–2015 Kamen Rider Series Kamen Rider Drive.  Reflecting the detective-investigative quality of the show, each episode's title is a question.

Episodes



References

Drive episodes
Episodes